In group theory, a metacyclic group is an extension of a cyclic group by a cyclic group. That is, it is a group G for which there is a short exact sequence

where H and K are cyclic. Equivalently, a metacyclic group is a group G having a cyclic normal subgroup N, such that the quotient G/N is also cyclic.

Properties

Metacyclic groups are both supersolvable and metabelian.

Examples
 Any cyclic group is metacyclic.
 The direct product or semidirect product of two cyclic groups is metacyclic.  These include the dihedral groups and the quasidihedral groups.
 The dicyclic groups are metacyclic. (Note that a dicyclic group is not necessarily a semidirect product of two cyclic groups.)
 Every finite group of squarefree order is metacyclic.
 More generally every Z-group is metacyclic.  A Z-group is a group whose Sylow subgroups are cyclic.

References

Properties of groups
Solvable groups